Mawab, officially the Municipality of Mawab, is a 3rd class municipality in the province of Davao de Oro, Philippines. According to the 2020 census, it has a population of 39,631 people.

History
Mawab was originally called by the early tribal group as 'Ma-awag' (wide valley). There are four rivers traversing Mawab, namely: Hijo, Mawab, Galinan, and Gumawan. There are several tribal groups in Mawab: Mansakas, Mandayas, and Dibabawons.

Mawab was organized into a municipality through Executive Order No. 351, issued by President Carlos P. Garcia on August 14, 1959. It consists of three barrios of Nabunturan, and three of Tagum, including Barrio Mawab which was designated as the seat of government, all then part of the old Davao province.

Geography
Mawab is bounded by the municipalities of Nabunturan, Davao de Oro, in the north-west; Montevista, Davao de Oro, and New Bataan, Davao de Oro, in the north-east; Maragusan, Davao de Oro (San Mariano) in the southeast; Municipalities of Maco, Davao de Oro, municipality of Mabini, Davao de Oro, and municipality of Pantukan, Davao de Oro in the south-west.

Municipality of Mawab due to its abundance and richness of trees, and rainforest does not normally experience floody climate during rainy season. However landslides occur in some areas. The river tributaries offer seasonal planting for agro-industrial businesses. Man-made fish ponds for fresh water fishes, that are privately owned are various opportunities for business entrepreneurs.

Climate

The prevailing climatic conditions in the municipality is categorized into two (2) types:
 Wet season (Rainy Season or Monsoon Season)
 Dry Season (Summer Season)

Barangays
Mawab is politically subdivided into 11 barangays.
 Andili
 Bawani
 Concepcion
 Malinawon
 Nueva Visayas
 Nuevo Iloco
 Poblacion
 Salvacion
 Saosao
 Sawangan
 Tuboran

Demographics

Ethnicity is varied and of mixed origin due to migration from different Major Islands: Luzon, Visayas, Mindanao.

Others are the 'Trival Group', 'Native Filipino' and some are of 'Chinese Ancestry': China. Those who immigrated from Mindanao Island, more specially from Zamboanga has 'Spanish Ancestry': Spain.

Majority of the populace are from two major islands of Visayas and Mindanao.

Languages and dialects
Languages spoken are products of migration of natives from different provinces of Visayas island, Mindanao island and some few in Luzon island.

 National Language - Tagalog (Vernacular language of the country).
 Regional Language - Cebuano (Visayas Island language).
 Tribal Languages - Mansaka: Mansakan language. Mandaya (Mandayan Language): Lumad people. Maranao.
 Provincial Languages - Hiligaynon (Ilongo), Ilokano language (Ilocano). Waray-Waray (Waray). Surigaonon language (Surigaynon) as well as Davawenyo language (Davao Region).

Religion
Religion in Mawab is predominantly Roman Catholic, Protestant, and some Muslims.

Economy

Government
Elected officials 2019–Present:
 Mayor: Ruperto Gonzaga III
 Vice Mayor: Binggot Gonzaga

Tourism
Municipality of Mawab has all its natural wonders of nature like verdant forest rich in fauna and wild flowers. Most orchids found in its rainforest do not thrive in Luzon island. It has hot springs and cold springs, mainly tributaries of the rivers that bounded the valley:
 Bukal Hot Spring (Natural Well Hot Spring)
 Mainit Hot Spring (Warm Hot Spring)
Mawab is home to the military camp of Philippine Army: Camp General Manuel T. Yan Sr.
 Camp General Manuel Tecson Yan Sr. - The camp is located in barangay Tuboran, a memorial for General Manuel Tecson Yan Sr. of Philippine Army who passed 2008. The camp was established February 11, 2011.
 Barona's Farm-Umahan is located at the Brgy. Poblacion and most famous farm in Mawab, Davao De Oro owned by the Barona's Family.

Education
Education in the Philippines is patterned from both of educational systems of Spain and the United States of America. However, after the liberation of the Philippines in 1946, Filipinos then had moved in various directions of its own. Elementary and high school education is compulsory, and is administered nationally by the Department of Education (Philippines), along with the assurance of funding for school services and equipment, recruitment of teachers for all public schools, and the supervising and organization of the education curricula. Based on the current education system of the Philippines, students should enter elementary schools at the age of 6 or 7, and for a duration of six years. Then, at the age of 12 or 13, students then enter high schools for a duration four years, with a total of ten years of compulsory 'Public Education'. All public and private elementary schools, high schools and colleges and universities in the Philippines start classes from early June to mid June and end from mid March to early April.

There are 'Summer Classes' in between (months of April to May) for college programs which is optional for students to take.

In elementary and secondary education, universities and colleges the vernacular language of the country, Filipino is part of educational curriculum. Spanish (Espanol) as well is part of the educational curriculum in universities as a compulsory subject (twenty one credits) to graduate and finish an educational degree or Bachelor of Science. The medium of instruction in the classrooms is in English, Filipino (Tagalog), and whatever regional dialect they have.

List of public and private schools
List of various public schools are all enlisted under Bureau of Secondary Education - Department of Education (DEP) Republic of the Philippines. For Mawab, Davao de Oro it is under Davao Region or Region 11 (Region 11): Department of Education (Philippines).

References

External links
 Mawab Profile at the DTI Cities and Municipalities Competitive Index
 [ Philippine Standard Geographic Code]
Philippine Census Information

Municipalities of Davao de Oro